Lucia de Berk (born September 22, 1961, in The Hague, Netherlands), often called Lucia de B., is a Dutch licensed paediatric nurse who was the subject of a miscarriage of justice. In 2003, she was sentenced to life imprisonment, for which no parole is possible under Dutch law, for four murders and three attempted murders of patients under her care. In 2004, after an appeal, she was convicted of seven murders and three attempted murders.

Her conviction was controversial in the media and by scientists, and it was questioned by the investigative reporter Peter R. de Vries. In October 2008, the case was reopened by the Dutch Supreme Court, as new facts had been uncovered that undermined the previous verdicts. De Berk was freed, and her case retried; she was exonerated in April 2010.

Charges 
Between September 2000 and September 2001, there appeared to have been nine incidents, which had then been thought unremarkable but later became considered medically suspicious. De Berk had been on duty at the time of those incidents and responsible for patient care and delivery of medication. The hospital decided to press charges against de Berk.

Life sentence 
On 24 March 2003, de Berk was sentenced by the court in The Hague to life imprisonment for the murder of four patients and the attempted murder of three others. The verdict depended in part on a statistical calculation, according to which the probability was allegedly only 1 in 342 million that a nurse's shifts would coincide with so many of the deaths and resuscitations purely by chance. However, De Berk was sentenced only for the cases in which, according to a medical expert, either other evidence was present or no natural causes could explain the incident.

In her appeal on 18 June 2004, de Berk's conviction for the seven murders and three attempted murders was upheld. The crimes were supposed to have taken place in three hospitals in The Hague: the Juliana Child Hospital (JKZ), the Red Cross Hospital (RKZ) and the Leyenburg Hospital, where de Berk had worked earlier. In two cases, the court concluded that there was proof that de Berk had poisoned the patients. Concerning the other cases the judges considered that they could not be explained medically and must have been caused by de Berk, who was present on all of those occasions. The idea that only weaker evidence was needed for the subsequent murders after two had been proven beyond reasonable doubt was dubbed chain-link proof by the prosecution and adopted by the court. At the 2004 trial, besides a life sentence, de Berk also received detention with coerced psychiatric treatment, but the state criminal psychological observation unit did not find any evidence of mental illness.

Important evidence at the appeal was to be the statement of a detainee in the Pieter Baan Center, a criminal psychological observation unit, where de Berk had said during outdoor exercise, "I released these 13 people from their suffering". However, during the appeal, the man withdrew his statement and stated that he had made it up. The news service of the Dutch Broadcasting Foundation (NOS) and other media following the process considered the withdrawal of that evidence to have been a huge setback for Public Prosecution Service (OM). A series of articles appeared over the following years in several newspapers, including  Vrij Nederland and the Volkskrant, and raised doubts on the conviction.

The case was next brought to the Dutch Supreme Court, which ruled on 14 March 2006 that it was incorrect to combine life imprisonment with subsequent psychiatric detention. Other complaints were not taken into consideration, and the evidence from a re-analysis by a Strasbourg laboratory was not considered to be relevant. The Supreme Court gave the matter back to the Court in Amsterdam to pass judgement again on the basis of the same factual conclusions that had been made before. Some days after the ruling of the Supreme Court, de Berk suffered a stroke and was admitted to the hospital of Scheveningen Prison. On July 13, 2006, de Berk was sentenced by the Court of Appeal in Amsterdam to life imprisonment, with no subsequent detention in psychiatric care.

Doubts 
A committee of support for de Berk was formed and continued to express doubts about her conviction. The philosopher of science Ton Derksen, aided by his sister, the geriatrician Metta de Noo-Derksen, wrote the Dutch book Lucia de B. Reconstructie van een gerechtelijke dwaling (Lucia de B: Reconstruction of a Miscarriage of Justice). They doubted the reasoning that was used by the court and the medical and statistical evidence that was presented. See also the English-language article Derksen and Meijsing (2009).

Chain-link proof 
Of the seven murders and three attempted murders that were finally attributed to de Berk by the court, it considered two of them to be proven by medical evidence. According to the court, de Berk had poisoned both patients. The court then applied a so-called chaining-evidence argument. If several attempted or actual murders had already been established beyond reasonable doubt, much weaker-than-normal evidence was considered by the court to be sufficient in establishing that eight subsequent "suspicious incidents" were actual or attempted murders that had been carried out by the same defendant.

For the two murders that were found to be proven by the court in The Hague, many experts  did not exclude a natural cause of death. For the case in which digoxin poisoning was alleged and supposedly detected by independent measurements in two Dutch laboratories, the method used in those laboratories did not exclude that the substance had actually been a related substance that is naturally produced in the human body. The Strasbourg laboratory used a new method, a test of high specificity and sensitivity, which did not support the digoxin overdose hypothesis. In the second case, the intoxication could have been an overdose caused by a faulty prescription. For both children, it was not clear how and when de Berk could have administered the poison. Regarding the digoxin case, the prosecution gave a detailed reconstruction of the timing. However, other parts of the evidence that were discarded by the prosecution had showed, by the timestamp on a certain monitor, that at the alleged moment of poisoning, de Berk was not with the patient at all and that the specialist and his assistant were then with the patient.

The prosecution initially charged de Berk of causing 13 deaths or medical emergencies. In court, the defence showed definitively that de Berk could not have been involved at all in several of the cases. For instance, she had been away for several days, and the idea that she was there had been caused by administrative errors. Furthermore, all deaths had been registered as natural except for the last event. Even that one had initially been thought to be death by natural causes by the doctors responsible for the child, but within a day, it had become connected by other hospital authorities with de Berk and her repeated presence at recent incidents and classified as an unnatural death.

Statistical arguments 

The court made heavy use of statistical calculations to achieve its conviction. In a 2003 television special of NOVA, a Dutch professor of criminal law, Theo de Roos, stated, "In the Lucia de B. case statistical evidence has been of enormous importance. I do not see how one could have come to a conviction without it". The law psychologist Henk Elffers, who was used by the courts as an expert witness on statistics in the original case and on appeal, was also interviewed on the programme and stated that the chance of a nurse working at the three hospitals being present at the scene of so many unexplained deaths and resuscitations was 1 in 342 million.

That value had been wrongly calculated. If one wishes to combine p-values (right-tail probabilities) of the statistical tests based on data from three separate wards, one must introduce a correction according to the number of tests, and the result then becomes 1 in 1 million.

Biased reporting meant that even that lower figure was invalid. Events were attributed to de Berk once suspicions began to fall on her, which could not have had anything to do with her. The statisticians Richard D. Gill and Piet Groeneboom calculated a chance of 1 in 25 that a nurse could experience a sequence of events of the same type as de Berk.

Philip Dawid, Professor of Statistics at the University of Cambridge, stated that Elffers  "made very big mistakes. He was not sufficiently professional to ask where the data came from and how accurate the data were. Even granted the data were accurate, he did some statistical calculations of a very simplistic nature, based on very simple and unrealistic assumptions. Even granted these assumptions, he had no idea how to interpret the numbers he got".

The use of probability arguments in the de Berk case was discussed in a 2007 Nature article by Mark Buchanan. He wrote:

At the initiative of Gill, a petition for a reopening of the de Berk case was started. On 2 November 2007, the signatures were presented to the Minister of Justice, Ernst Hirsch Ballin, and the State Secretary of Justice, Nebahat Albayrak. Over 1300 people signed the petition.

Diary 
De Berk's diary also played a role in her conviction. On the day of death of one of her patients (an elderly lady in a terminal stage of cancer), she wrote that she had "given in to her compulsion". She wrote on other occasions that she had a "very great secret" and that she was concerned about "her tendency to give in to her compulsion". De Berk stated that they were references to her passion for reading tarot cards, which she explained to have done secretly because she did not believe it to be appropriate to the clinical setting of a hospital. However, the court decided the references were evidence that she had euthanised the patients. According to the court, the reading of cards did not accord with a "compulsion" or "perhaps an expression of fatigue," as her diary had described at the time. De Berk's daughter Fabiënne stated in an interview on the television programme Pauw & Witteman that some of her mother's notes in the diaries were "pure fiction," which she intended to use in writing a thriller.

Netherlands Forensic Institute report 
After the appeal proceedings were closed, but before the judges delivered their verdict, the Public Prosecution Service received, via the Netherlands Forensic Institute (NFI), a report from a forensic laboratory in Strasbourg on the evidence for digoxin poisoning. The report subsequently lay in a drawer of the NFI for two years but turned up in time for the final evaluation of the case before the Supreme Court. According to the Public Prosecution, the report contained no new facts, but according to de Berk's defence, the report proved that there had not been a lethal concentration of digoxin in the first case. The Supreme Court accepted the facts reported by the judges at the appeal court and was concerned only with jurisprudence and the correctness of the sentence, given those facts. The report, therefore, was not admitted into the final considerations of the sentence given to de Berk.

Posthumus II Commission 
In general, in the Dutch legal system, cases are not re-opened unless a new fact, called a novum, is found. A new interpretation by experts of old facts and data is generally not considered to be a novum.

However, Ton Derksen submitted his and Metta de Noo's research on the case to the Posthumus II Commission. The ad hoc non-permanent commission examines selected closed cases and looks for evidence of errors in the police investigation indicating "tunnel vision" and misunderstanding of scientific evidence. Derksen pointed out that the medical experts who had ruled out the possibility of death by natural causes had not been given all relevant information, the hypothesis of digoxin poisoning was disproven particularly by the Strasbourg analysis, the statistical data were biased and the analysis incorrect, and the conclusions drawn from it invalid. The commission announced on 19 October 2006 that it was one of the few cases that it would consider in detail. Three men, recruited by the Public Prosecution Service from the full Posthumus II committee, considered the following matters and had been instructed to focus on possible blemishes in the criminal investigation:

Whether there were also unexplained deaths for which de Berk had not been present, unknown to the public prosecutor.
Whether the expert witnesses had been given all relevant available information.
Whether scientific knowledge threw a different light on the digoxin question.

In October 2007, the commission released its report and recommended for the case to be reopened. It concluded that the case had been seriously marred from the start by tunnel vision. In particular, the same persons, chosen from close circles of the hospital authorities, rather than on the basis of recognised relevant expertise, had first helped the hospital in its internal investigations, had then advised the police, and finally had appeared before the courts as independent scientific experts. They noted that there was strong disagreement on whether the baby Amber had died of digoxin poisoning. On 2 April 2008, de Berk was released for three months because after the re-examination of the death of the last "victim", a natural death could no longer be ruled out.

Case reopened 
On 17 June 2008, the Advocate-General of the Supreme Court, G. Knigge, made a request for the Supreme Court to reopen the case. On 7 October 2008, the court acceded to his request by acknowledging that new facts uncovered by Knigge substantially undermined the earlier evidence. In particular, an independent team of medical researchers with access to all available medical information had reported to Advocate-General Knigge that the death that had sparked the case appears to have been a natural death. The key toxicologist of the earlier trials had agreed with the new medical findings and pointed out that at the time of the trial, the court had given him only partial information on the medical state of the child. De Berk's statements on her doings on the night of that child's death had also been shown to be correct. Indeed, during the period in which the courts had earlier concluded that she must have administered poison, the baby was actually being treated by a medical specialist and his assistant.

De Berk was allowed to remain free while she awaited a retrial at the Court of Arnhem, which first adjourned while further investigations were made. The public prosecution had asked for extensive new forensic investigations, but the request was turned down by the court. Instead, it commissioned further independent medical investigations into the cases of two other children and again allowed multidisciplinary medical team access to all possible medical data on the children. At a session on 9 December 2009, the court stated that new integral medical investigations of the last nine months had confirmed that the cases of Amber, Achmed and Achraf had all been natural deaths/incidents. They were the only cases for which proof had been previously claimed of de Berk's culpability.

The appeal hearing ended on 17 March 2010. Witnesses heard on the final day stated that the deaths at the Juliana Children's Hospital were natural and were sometimes caused by wrong treatment or bad hospital management or sometimes unexpected because of faulty medical diagnosis. The behaviour of the nurses, including de Berk, during a couple of medical crises turned out to have been swift and effective and to have saved lives on several occasions. The Public Prosecution capitulated by formally requesting the court to deliver a not guilty verdict, which occurred on 14 April 2010.

It was the new finding of allegedly very high digoxin levels in autopsy blood in a child under the care of de Berk that had resulted in her second conviction and life sentence for murder at the 2004 appeal hearings. However, it had already been known that digoxin levels on autopsy blood should be expected to be far higher than those in a living patient. Living heart cells extract digoxin from the blood and concentrate it to levels up to 1,000 times the therapeutic digoxin levels in the circulating blood. Heart cells die within minutes after death and so digoxin can then diffuse into the blood in the heart and in the surrounding large blood vessels, the sites from which blood is extracted by pathologists for blood chemistry analysis. Moreover, the autopsy blood did not originate from a proper blood sample but was squeezed out of a piece of gauze left inside the body after two autopsies had disturbed all of the organs.

Without the misinterpretation of the autopsy blood digoxin levels, there would not have been any consideration of digoxin poisoning, and no criminal investigation would have occurred. Furthermore, a chemical used in pharmaceutical natural rubber (in syringes, ampoule seals, and IV apparatus) manufacture, MBT (mercapto-benzothiazole) leaches into injections (J.H. Meek and B.R. Pettit, Avoidable accumulation of potentially toxic levels of bezothiazoldes in babies receiving intravenous therapy; Lancet, 1985, Vol. 2, pp. 1090–1092). It can cause death as a cumulative toxin or from anaphylaxis. MBT is measured as digoxin (J.J. Reepmeyer, Y.H.  Jule, "Contamination of Injectable solutions with 2-mercaptobenzothiazole from rubber closures", The Journal of Pharmaceutical Sciences, Vol. 72, 1983, pp. 1302–1305), using the test methods applied in the criminal investigations of Lucia de Berk and of a Canadian nurse, Susan Nelles.

Nelles was similarly charged with murder of children by digoxin poisoning at the Toronto Hospital for Sick Children in 1981. She was not convicted because, like for de Berk, all of the evidence was circumstantial. It was not until 1993 that the causes for high digoxin on autopsy blood were explained in the Canadian Nurse Journal, as is discussed thoroughly in a 2011 book, “The Nurses are Innocent – The Digoxin Poisoning Fallacy” (Dundurn Press, Toronto). The book presents facts to defend Nelles that apply similarly to the false charge of digoxin poisoning directed at de Berk.

Compensation 
On 12 November 2010, it was revealed that de Berk had received an undisclosed amount of compensation from the Ministry of Justice. The news was first broadcast by a local television station in the western Netherlands. It was later confirmed by the ministry to the Dutch news agency ANP.

See also
Miscarriages of justice in the Netherlands
Sally Clark
Prosecutor's fallacy
Accused (2014 film), a 2014 Dutch film

References

Sources
Buchanan, Mark. "Statistics: Conviction by numbers." Nature. 445, 254-255 (18 January 2007) | ; Published online 17 January 2007
 Leila Schneps and Coralie Colmez, Math on trial. How numbers get used and abused in the courtroom, Basic Books, 2013. . (Seventh chapter: "Math error number 7: the incredible coincidence. The case of Lucia de Berk: carer or killer?").

External links
 Site on statistical aspects of case, by Richard D. Gill, Professor of Mathematical Statistics at Leiden University.
 Site of Dutch committee for Lucia de B. Site of Dutch committee for Lucia de B. by Metta de Noo and Ton Derksen (contains also English language pages)
 Three reasoning instincts and the fabrication of facts: the case Lucia de B., by Ton Derksen

1961 births
Living people
Overturned convictions
Forensic statistics
People in health professions from The Hague
Dutch nurses
Dutch prisoners sentenced to life imprisonment